Aras Bulut İynemli (born 25 August 1990) is a Turkish actor. He is best known for his performances in As Time Goes by (2010–2013), Magnificent Century (2013–2014), Insider (2016–2017), The Pit (2017–2021) and Miracle in Cell No.7 (2019). In 2017, İynemli earned the Golden Butterfly Award for Best Actor for his role as Yamaç Koçovalı in The Pit.

Personal life 
He has an older brother, actor Orçun İynemli and an older sister, television host and singer Yeşim İynemli. Other relatives who are actors are Miray Daner (cousin), Cengiz Daner (uncle) and İlhan Daner (great uncle).

Career 
After playing a role in 2–3 commercials, he got a role in the drama series Öyle Bir Geçer Zaman ki in 2010. This drama gained international success and İynemli received a reward as well. Before this he had also worked in the drama Back Street, but he took a hiatus after the first part as he had to complete his education of aircraft engineering. He performed in the top 100 in the university entrance exam ÖSS in Turkey, which is similar to the (SAT) exam in the US. He continued his studies at the Istanbul Technical University. In 2011, while he was 20 he received the Antalya Television Award for Best Supporting Actor.

In 2013 he appeared in the Azerbaijani-Turkish movie Mahmut and Meryem, based on a novel by Elçin Efendiyev. He played a disabled boy in Tamam mıyız? and portrayed Şehzade Bayezid on Muhteşem Yüzyıl in the same year.

In 2015, İynemli was selected to play the main male character in the series Maral: En Güzel Hikayem together with the actress Hazal Kaya. In 2016–17, he played the role of Umut Yılmaz / Mert Karadağ in İçerde. In 2017, he began playing the role of Yamaç Koçovalı in Çukur.

In 2019, İynemli portrayed a mentally ill father who was wrongly imprisoned for murder in 7. Koğuştaki Mucize, which broke viewing records in Turkey within a short period. After the movie was broadcast on Netflix, it was well received by audience in France and Latin America.

In addition to his acting career, İynemli has appeared in many advertising films and is the face of numerous brands.

Filmography

Film

Television

Web

Awards and nominations

References

External links 
 
 Aras Bulut İynemli on Twitter

1990 births
Istanbul Technical University alumni
Living people
Male actors from Istanbul
Turkish male film actors
Turkish male television actors
Golden Butterfly Award winners